Aleksandr Vladimirovich Nechayev (born 19 January 1987) is a former professional Russian football player.

Club career
He played 6 seasons in the Russian Football National League for FC Sodovik Sterlitamak, FC SKA-Energiya Khabarovsk and FC Rotor Volgograd.

External links
 
 

1987 births
People from Kurgan, Kurgan Oblast
Living people
Russian footballers
Association football midfielders
FC Tobol Kurgan players
FC Krasnodar players
FC Sodovik Sterlitamak players
FC Rotor Volgograd players
FC SKA-Khabarovsk players
FC Taganrog players
FC Olimpia Volgograd players
FC Rostov players
FC Nosta Novotroitsk players
Sportspeople from Kurgan Oblast